The following is a summary of Dublin county football team's 2007 season.

O'Byrne Cup
2007 O'Byrne Cup

National Football League (Division 1A) results
2007 National Football League

Leinster & All-Ireland Championship results
All-Ireland Senior Football Championship 2007

References

Season Dublin
Dublin county football team seasons